Emanuel Biancucchi Cuccittini (born 28 July 1988) is an Argentine professional footballer who plays as a midfielder for Campeonato Carioca club Resende.

Career
A youth product of Newell's Old Boys, Biancucchi moved to Germany in 2008 to join 2. Bundesliga club 1860 Munich.

In January 2011, he joined Serie A club Cesena for a trial period, but transferred to Girona FC in the Segunda División instead, but he still has a valid contract with 1860.

Personal life
Emanuel Biancucchi is the cousin of Paris Saint-Germain forward Lionel Messi (the son of his mother's sister) and the younger brother of retired forward Maximiliano Biancucchi. He also has Italian citizenship, and is represented by his uncle (Jorge Messi, Lionel's father).

References

External links
 

Living people
1988 births
Footballers from Rosario, Santa Fe
Argentine footballers
Argentine people of Italian descent
Italian footballers
Association football midfielders
Newell's Old Boys footballers
TSV 1860 Munich players
TSV 1860 Munich II players
Independiente F.B.C. footballers
Club Olimpia footballers
Esporte Clube Bahia players
CR Vasco da Gama players
Ceará Sporting Club players
FBC Melgar footballers
2. Bundesliga players
Campeonato Brasileiro Série A players
Campeonato Brasileiro Série B players
Peruvian Primera División players
Argentine expatriate footballers
Expatriate footballers in Paraguay
Expatriate footballers in Germany
Expatriate footballers in Spain
Expatriate footballers in Brazil
Argentine expatriate sportspeople in Germany
Argentine expatriate sportspeople in Spain
Argentine expatriate sportspeople in Brazil